The Frank Gillard Awards are awards for BBC Local Radio stations in the UK. They are named after Frank Gillard who initiated the BBC's local radio network. The award is a head of Frank Gillard and is  given as Gold, Silver and Bronze degrees.

The annual Frank Gillard Awards were launched in 2000 in memory of the war correspondent and founder of BBC Local Radio.

Their aim is to recognise achievements and encourage excellence in the programming at BBC Local Radio stations across England.

Categories
Not all categories are awarded each year.
 The Breakfast Programme
 Programme Presenter
 Coverage of a New Story
 Interactive Programme
 Reporter
 Sports Coverage
 Social Action Campaign
 Radio Feature
 Outside Broadcast
 Religious Programming
 Radio Promotion
 Sense of Place
 Diversity
 Outstanding Contribution to BBC Local Radio
 Station of the Year
 Best Multi Media Treatment

References

British radio awards